John F. Grundhofer (January 1, 1939 – January 24, 2021) was a director of Donaldson Company, Securian Financial Group Inc., and BJ's Restaurant & Brewery. He served as Chairman (1990–1997 and 1999–2002), Chief Executive Officer (1990–2001) and President (1990–1999 and 2000–2001) of U.S. Bancorp (formerly First Bank System), a financial services provider. On retirement he was succeeded by his brother Jerry Grundhofer.

He was a graduate of Loyola High School (Los Angeles) and Loyola Marymount University. He received an MBA in Finance from the University of Southern California.

Grundhofer was purportedly kidnapped from a Minneapolis parking garage in November 1990. He escaped after being bound and stuffed in a sleeping bag. No one was ever charged in the kidnapping.

See also
List of kidnappings

References 

1939 births
2021 deaths
American chief executives of food industry companies
American chief executives of financial services companies
Businesspeople from Los Angeles
Kidnapped American people
Formerly missing people
Loyola Marymount University alumni
Marshall School of Business alumni